Mount Fourcade is a mountain standing  southwest of Cape Anna and Anna Cove and east of Orne Harbour, on the west coast of Graham Land, Antarctica. It was charted by the Belgian Antarctic Expedition under Gerlache, 1897–99, and was named by the UK Antarctic Place-Names Committee in 1960 for the South African surveyor Henry Georges Fourcade, who designed the stereogoniometer and gave it practical application for plotting photogrammetric surveys in about 1900.

References 

Mountains of Graham Land
Danco Coast